Dating in the Dark is a reality show created in the Netherlands where 3 single men and 3 single women move into a light-tight house getting to know each other and form bonds in total darkness.

Format

Dating
Three men and three women are sequestered in separate wings of the house, unable to have any conversation or contact with the opposite sex unless in the dark room. Initially, all six contestants have a group date in which they all sit at a table in the dark room exchanging names and getting to know one another's voices and personality types. After this date, each contestant can invite another contestant for a one-on-one date; these dates are also held in the dark room.

Throughout the show, the host provides the men and women with additional insights by providing personality profiles showing which contestants are their best matches and also allowing them to view items the others have brought to the house, such as items of clothing or luggage. Other episodes include sketch artists drawing contestants' impressions of each other.

After the one-on-one dates, each contestant can choose to invite another that they wish to see. The contestants enter the dark room for the final time and are revealed to each other one at a time. During the reveal process the couple must remain silent.

The Reveal Process
While being shown in the light, a contestant cannot see the other contestant's reaction.  Each contestant is standing at opposite ends of the dark room with a very large two-way mirror between them. A color camera films from the dark side of the mirror while the other is illuminated on the other side. A separate infrared camera films the person on the dark side's reaction; the two images are combined in post-production.  This is done, in part, by using video editing software to fade the infrared image of the person being revealed to black before they are illuminated, then seamlessly showing the color image of the person being revealed as it is faded in and out.  During the reveal process the couple must remain silent.

The Balcony
The show culminates with each contestant choosing whether to meet another on the balcony of the house. The contestant will go to the balcony and wait for his or her prospective partner to join him or her. Joining the other on the balcony signifies that the contestants both want to pursue a relationship; exiting the house through the front door signifies that they do not want to pursue a relationship. Cameras are set up to show both the meeting balcony and the front door.

International versions

References

External links
 Dutch version official website
 Australian version official website
 Finnish version official website
 Israeli version official website

Dating and relationship reality television series
Banijay franchises